Pascal Cygan (born 29 April 1974) is a French former footballer. His favoured position was central defender, but he could also play as a left back.

After starting out at Lille in his country, Cygan would play four years in the Premier League with Arsenal and three in La Liga with Villarreal, in a 17-year professional career.

Early life
Cygan was born in Lens, Pas-de-Calais.

Club career

Lille
Cygan started his senior career in the ranks of lowly ES Wasquehal before going professional with Lille OSC in 1995, making his Division 1 debut that year but also going on to also spend three seasons in Division 2. In 1999–2000 he was an instrumental defensive element for the champions and, in the subsequent top-flight campaign, helped them achieve a third-place finish, with qualification to the UEFA Champions League.

In this time, Cygan was also promoted to captaincy, seen as a role model to help develop the younger players. He was also winner of the Etoile d'Or in his last year in France.

Arsenal
Cygan joined Arsenal in July 2002 for £2 million, making his debut in a 1–1 draw with Chelsea on 1 September after coming on as a late substitute for Nwankwo Kanu. While he featured notably in some of the team's more important fixtures, he was mostly considered only a fringe player; he missed the 2003 FA Cup Final through injury, but did pick up a Premier League winners' medal in 2004 after contributing with 18 appearances.

Cygan scored three goals for Arsenal in league action, including an unlikely brace in his first game of 2005–06 against Fulham (4–1 home win). Until then he had only netted once, against Everton in March 2003.

Also that season, following injuries to both Ashley Cole and Gaël Clichy, Cygan was drafted in as an emergency left back, and was even named in the Opta team of the week on 9 January 2006. Overall, his side won 12 of the 20 matches he played in and kept 11 clean sheets in the process. He suffered a hamstring injury in January against Middlesbrough and was unable to play again that season as he was fourth choice behind Sol Campbell, Philippe Senderos and Kolo Touré, with young Johan Djourou also competing for a place. 

Cygan played 98 competitive games during his spell at Highbury, including 20 in the Champions League.

Spain
In August 2006, Cygan completed a transfer to Villarreal CF for a £2 million transfer fee, joining former Arsenal teammate and compatriot Robert Pires at the club. On 6 June 2008, after having been fairly used in his first two years, mainly due to consecutive serious injuries to Gonzalo Rodríguez, he signed a new one-year deal. However, following a lack of first-team opportunities in 2008–09, and with Villarreal unwilling to extend his contract for a further campaign, he left in July 2009; his La Liga goals came on 5 November 2006 against Real Betis (3–2 home win), and against Levante UD on 31 October 2007 (3–0, also at El Madrigal).

On 10 August 2009, Cygan joined FC Cartagena, recently promoted to Segunda División, on a one-year deal. Aged 37, he was released by the Murcians and retired from professional football.

Honours
Lille
Division 2: 1999–2000

Arsenal
Premier League: 2003–04
FA Community Shield: 2002, 2004

Individual
Etoile d'Or: 2001–02

References

External links

1974 births
Living people
People from Lens, Pas-de-Calais
Sportspeople from Pas-de-Calais
French footballers
Association football defenders
Wasquehal Football players
Lille OSC players
Arsenal F.C. players
Villarreal CF players
FC Cartagena footballers
Ligue 1 players
Ligue 2 players
Premier League players
La Liga players
Segunda División players
French expatriate footballers
Expatriate footballers in England
Expatriate footballers in Spain
French expatriate sportspeople in England
French expatriate sportspeople in Spain
Footballers from Hauts-de-France